Streamtime Software is a web-based project-management tool, first launched in 2002 under the company name Particle Systems Limited.

Originally developed for the FileMaker platform and called 'Studio Assist', the product has progressed through multiple iterations with a fully web-based version of Streamtime released in April 2016. Founded in Christchurch, New Zealand, there are offices in Sydney, Melbourne, Dublin and Christchurch.

Versions
Studio Assist, launched in 2002
Streamline Studio Assist, launched in 2003
Streamline, released in 2004
Streamtime Classic, was released in 2007 '
Streamtime, launched in April 2016

Awards
2007 ANZ Canterbury Export Awards Solid Energy Canterbury Emerging Exporter of the Year.  
2007 Ranked 26th (261% growth rate) in the Deloitte/Unlimited "Fastest Growing Technology Business"
2007 Ranked 190th in the Deloitte Asia Pacific Fast 500 growing businesses. 
2007 Canterbury regional award for Fastest Growing Technology Business NZ. 
2008 Top Ten Deloittes Fast 50 growing NZ 8th fastest growing company with growth well over 400% 
2008 Ranked 127th in the fast 500 growing companies for Asia Pacific.
2008 FileMaker excellence award winner.
2008 FileMaker business driver Asia Pacific Region.
2009 Ranked in the Technology Fast 500 for Asia Pacific (third year running).
2016 Silver in the Application, Website and Brand categories of the Best Design Awards, awarded by the Designers Institute of New Zealand.'
2016 Pinnacle Award for Identity, Branding - Large Business '
2016 Gold at the Sydney Design Awards, in the Digital - Business Operations category '
2017 D&AD Professional Award in the Branding - Medium Organisation category'
2017 Winner Webby Awards, Websites - Web Services & Applications category.'
2017 Capterra Most recommended Project Management tool for Creatives.
2017 Capterra Best Support.
2017 Capterra Best Value Project Management tool for Creatives.
2017 AGDA distinction award for Design Effectiveness.'
2017 AGDA distinction award for Brand Expression in Moving Image.'
2018 Silver in the Large Scale Website category of the Best Design Awards, awarded by the Designers Institute of New Zealand.'
2018 Bronze in the Interactive category of the Best Design Awards, awarded by the Designers Institute of New Zealand.'
2018 Bronze in the Design Craft category of the Best Design Awards, awarded by the Designers Institute of New Zealand.'
2018 AGDA distinction award for Design Crafts.
2019 Webby Awards Nominee in Web Services & Applications.
2019 W3 Awards for Best in Show - Web Applications/Services.
2020 Webby Awards People's Choice Winner in Web Services & Applications.

See also
 Project management software
 Project management
 Web 2.0

References

External links
 Official site

Project management software
Software companies of New Zealand